The South Florida Bulls football team represents the University of South Florida in American football.

Seasons

Notes

References

South Florida
South Florida Bulls football seasons